The Constitution of Egypt has passed over a long period of evolution from the liberal constitution of 1923 to the contemporary constitution.

Ancient Egypt
Egypt is known for having one of the earliest administrative and legislative codes in history. 
Pharaonic civilization laid the groundwork in Egypt in terms of governance and management. The king, or Pharaoh, at the top of the state hierarchy, appointed high-ranking government officials.

Early Islamic era
During the Islamic era, governance and legislation were principally drawn from the Qur'an and the Sunna (Traditions of the Prophet) based on the formula of consultation as one of the fundamental principles of Islamic law.

When Egypt became the capital of the Shi'ite Fatimid Caliphate (969-1171) governance and legislation developed. Furthermore, the city of Cairo became the capital of Egypt.

Throughout the era of the Ayubi state (1171–1250), the Citadel became the headquarters and the center of power. Legislative and judicial councils diversified, and there was a justice council and another to attend to complaints lodged. Their duties involved laws as well as treaties with foreign countries

In the Mamluk era (1250–1517) Sultan El-Zaher Bebars built the Court of Justice at Salah El-Deen El-Ayoubi Citadel to be the government premises. Its competence covered enforcement of laws, settling of disputes, and negotiations with nearby countries.

Ottoman Empire
During the Ottoman era, (1517–1805) Islamic courts constituted the judicial system. Judges had their verdicts directly based on Islamic jurisprudence (Sharia) as far as civil and criminal disputes were concerned. This continued in effect until the end of the 18th Century. Thus, Egypt had been the scene of crucial political and social developments.

In 1795, almost six years after the French revolution, a major political uprising demanding rights, freedoms and justice fueled. It brought together national forces and popular leaderships in support of national demands for justice, equality, and freedom.

As a result of the mounting resistance against the Ottoman ruler, the Wali, and Mamluks, Egypt was on the verge of a massive revolt. This led to the Ulama laying their hands on a written document which outlined the relationship between the ruler and subject which averted a raise in taxes without the consent of the people's representatives.

20th century

The first 20th century constitution for Egypt is that of 1923, the first modern codified form of a national constitution. It provided for monarchical dominance with the king as head of state with power to influence the legislature.  The 1923 Constitution remained in effect throughout the remainder of the monarchy except for the period from 1930 to 1935 when the Constitution of 1930 was in effect.

Following the Egyptian revolution of 1952 that led to the overthrow of the monarch, King Farouk, the Constitution of 1923 was abolished by decree in December 1952.  In 1953, a provisional constitution was proclaimed on 10 February, and Egypt was declared a republic on 18 June.  The republic was governed under martial law until mid-1956.

The Constitution of 1956 adopted by President Nasser was the first republican constitution and it stipulated the formation of the National Assembly on 22 July 1957. The assembly was made up of 350 elected members and remained effective until 10 February 1958, when the Egyptian-Syrian merger as the United Arab Republic was given force and the 1956 Constitution revoked.

The Provisional Constitution of the United Arab Republic was formulated in March 1958, and a joint National Assembly was established. It first met on 21 July 1960 and lasted to 22 June 1961.

Following the 1961 secession of the Syrian Arab Republic from the United Arab Republic, on 21 May 1962, Nasser issued a National Charter that was approved by a 1,750-member National Congress of Popular Powers on 30 June.  Though not a constitution, this charter was a distillation of Nasser's Arab socialist ideology and the basis for future constitutional efforts in the 1960s.  On 27 September 1962, a presidential Constitutional Proclamation was made, which stipulated that the Provisional Constitution of 1958 should remain in force insofar as it did not contradict the Proclamation.

In March 1964, another provisional Constitution was declared, the "Constitution of the United Arab Republic", leading to a 350-elected member National Assembly. This Assembly lasted from 26 March 1964 to 12 November 1968. New elections were held on 20 January 1969, and the Assembly was valid until 30 August 1971. Egypt continued to be known officially as the United Arab Republic during this period.

In 1971, when President Anwar Sadat took office, he moved towards the adoption of a new democratic constitution that would allow more freedoms; the return to a more sound parliamentary life, correct democratic practice and made Sharia "a source of legislation" (Article II), amended in 1980 to read "the principal source of legislation."  With the 1971 constitution, the country was renamed the Arab Republic of Egypt.

21st century
In 2005, President Hosni Mubarak asked the parliament to amend Article 76 of the constitution that defines how the President of Egypt is elected.

2011 Egyptian revolution

During the 2011 Egyptian revolution, opponents to President Mubarak demanded modifications to the constitution or rewriting it. On 10 February 2011, Mubarak stated that he had requested that Articles 76, 77, 88, 93 and 181 be amended and that Article 179 be removed. Following Mubarak's resignation, the military government of Egypt appointed the Egyptian constitutional review committee of 2011 and proposed that Articles 76, 77, 88, 93, 139, 148 and 189 be amended and Article 179 removed.
On 30 March, a new provisional constitution was adopted based on the amended articles in addition to other aimed at steering through the transition period of constitutional reform. A new constitution was approved in 2012.

2013–2014
President Mohamed Morsi was removed from office in July 2013, and the 2012 constitution was suspended. A roadmap was put in place by the interim government, which included drafting a new constitution. A constitutional referendum took place from 14–15 January 2014, with the overwhelming majority of voters approving the revised constitution.

List of written constitutions
Monarchy
Constitution of 1879: 1879 (abortive)
Fundamental Ordinance of 1882: 1882
Constitution of 1923: 1923–1930, 1935–1952
Constitution of 1930: 1930–1935
Republic, following the abolition of the monarchy
Provisional constitution of 1953: 10 February – 1956
Constitution of 1956: 23 June 1956 – 1958
Constitution of 1958 (provisional, United Arab Republic): 10 February 1958 – 1962
Constitutional Proclamation of 1962: 27 September 1962 – 1964
Constitution of 1964 ("Constitution of the United Arab Republic", provisional): 1964–1971
Constitution of 1971: 11 September 1971 – 2011; adopted by President Anwar Sadat
Constitutional Declaration of 2011 (provisional): 2011–2012; following the Egyptian Revolution of 2011
Constitution of 2012: 2012–2014; approved by a referendum on 15 and 22 December 2012 
 Constitution of 2014: 2014–present; revision of the 2012 Constitution approved by a referendum on 14–15 January 2014

References

Constitutions of Egypt
Legal history of Egypt
Political history of Egypt
Egypt

pt:Política do Egipto